The Manitoba Warriors (MW) are an indigenous street gang based in Winnipeg, Manitoba, Canada. Predominantly based in the Central and North End neighbourhoods of the city, the gang is an exclusively indigenous organization that was established on the Lake Manitoba First Nation in 1993 to rival the Indian Posse gang.

Criminal Intelligence Service Canada (CISC) has designated the Manitoba Warriors as being a member of indigenous-based organized crime (IBOC). CISC asserts that the gang, in addition to engaging in marijuana cultivation, auto theft, illegal firearms activities, gambling, and drug trafficking, also supports and facilitates criminal activities for the Hells Angels motorcycle gang and Asian-based networks.

Origins 
The Manitoba Warriors were formed as a prison gang in 1993, originating as an exclusively Aboriginal criminal organization at the Stony Mountain Institution. They created the MW to protect Native and Metis inmates and to rival traditional prison gangs. As incarcerated members were released, they recruited disenfranchised, young Aboriginals from their neighbourhoods. Unlike other Aboriginal gangs, they chose a structure similar to that found in outlaw biker culture. Each member holds a specific ranking, similar to the ranks found in outlaw biker clubs. However, according to former president Brian Contois, the Warriors were founded on a code of ethics aimed at bringing some level of morality, pride, and dignity to a way of life that would otherwise be unobtainable to these youth. This gang lifestyle promised them employment, money and brotherhood. By creating this place to find their identity there was a boom of recruitment, which might explain the variations in the MW's actual size. There are 300 active members listed in the City of Winnipeg’s gang unit database and a further 140 inactive. 

The Manitoba Warriors purchased their drugs from los Bravos biker gang led by Ernie Dew. When Dew and the rest of los Bravos gang joined the Hells Angels in December 2000, the same relationship continued with the Angels as the senior partner and the Warriors as the junior partners.

Expansion

They first caught the attention of the police in 1993 and have since become a focal point of police investigation due to the volume and intensity of their activities. There have been three major operations against the Manitoba Warriors starting with Operation Northern Snow in 1998. The police then launched Project Octopus after finding out that the Warriors were exploiting Government funding for a homelessness initiative called Paa Pii Wak. One of the Warriors most recent setbacks was a raid, labeled Project Falling Star, resulting in the arrest of 57 members and associates. As the Warriors expanded out of prison into Winnipeg and the surrounding area they also expanded their prison network. Their main territories are in the Central and North End neighborhoods of Winnipeg. The Manitoba Warriors have long purchased their drugs from the Hells Angels and are considered to be a puppet gang for the Angels.

Insignia 
The patch or insignia of a criminal organization is an important visual representation of the group. The patch of the Manitoba Warriors is an eight-pointed sun with the head of a Native American Warrior in the center. It is also often customary that a gang is represented by a colour, and for the Warriors it is black.  Besides their patched vests, there are jerseys, sweaters and tank tops displaying symbols of the Manitoba Warriors as is common among similar organizations.

The Manitoba Warriors often refer to their gang as 1323, and those numbers have become synonymous with the MW. The numbers 13 and 23 stand for the location of "M" and "W" in the alphabet.. These numbers have become common in reference to the Warriors and is common in tattoos of their organization.

Structure 
The Manitoba Warriors began rejecting the structure of similar rival gangs and instead their organization is structured similar to outlaw motorcycle clubs. Senior members' ranks are indicated by tattoos and titles including a president, vice-president and sergeant-at-arms. Prospective members are apprentices before they become a fully fledged members, analogous to the process of "striking" in biker gangs. After the police operation Northern Snow the Warriors changed from classic biker culture and formed three distinct cells the Ruthless Warriors, Central Warriors, and Notorious Krew. The strategy behind this was that if one of the cells is compromised by a police interdiction it would not affect the other cells. A short time later they scrapped the three-cell strategy and returned to a single cohesive organization, because rival organizations were expanding too quickly for the three separate cells.  The Warriors reinstated leadership titles and a new "council" of high-ranking members was created to make decisions and pass down orders to other members in a way that protected the council from direct involvement in crime.

Territory 
The Manitoba Warriors are typically located in the central and northern suburbs of Winnipeg. Other organizations that have adopted the "Warriors" banner such as the Alberta and Saskatchewan Warriors, helped spread the gang's influence to other cities. However, their turf is not exclusive to these areas, and the Warriors also have a substantial prison network.

Prison network 

The Manitoba Warriors started out as an exclusively Aboriginal organization designed to protect Native and Métis inmates against aggression from other prison groups at the Stony Mountain Institution but have since spread to the Headingley Correctional Institution and Edmonton Institution.

Affiliated criminal organizations 
The Manitoba Warriors have been known to work with and align themselves with other criminal organizations. The Rock Machine Motorcycle Club began recruiting from the Warriors. Saskatchewan Warriors, Alberta Warriors, CENTRAL, Loyalty Honour Silence and MOB Squad are some of their more well known affiliations. interesting thing about the Manitoba Warriors is that they created the Warriors banner that was adopted to create new criminal organizations. Criminal Organizations like the Alberta Warriors and Saskatchewan Warriors originally adopted this banner under the Manitoba Warriors and have since separated and expanded. Saskatchewan Warriors originally worked for the MW but have become a separate affiliated criminal organization. The SW is also an Aboriginal street gang that are active mainly in the Regina, Saskatoon and Prince Albert areas of Saskatchewan. Although MW and SW are in separate cities with similar street codes the AW SW gangs, they have been known to work together from time to time.

Rival criminal organizations 
Indian Posse, Native Syndicate, Terror Squad, Manitoba Blood Family, PK Mobsters, Redd Alert, Mad Cowz, Bloods, Hells Angels, the Zig Zag Crew, and MOB are all known rivals of the MW. The Most Organized Brothers or MOB squad was once affiliated with the MW but due to an unspecified "blow out" the alliance fell apart. This falling out has caused an air of bad blood between the two organizations to exist even today.

Indian Posse
Throughout the years there has been a violent rivalry between the Indian Posse and the Manitoba Warriors. The Manitoba Warriors met their first rivals in the form of the Indian Posse. On April 25, 1996 the Manitoba Warriors and the Indian Posse members got into an altercation at the Headingley Correctional Institution, causing a riot. The riot lasted 8 hours and caused approximately seven million dollars in damages. Eight guards and 31 inmates were injured in the riot.

Hells Angels
The Manitoba Warriors serve as a puppet gang for the Hells Angels, whom are the main suppliers of the drugs they sell.

Police interventions

Operation Northern Snow 

In 1998, the Winnipeg police were given the authority to begin a long investigation called Operation Northern Snow to counter the gang's drug trafficking. Thirty-five gang members were arrested and charged under new federal anti-gang legislation and held in a maximum security court house without the option for bail. Some members spent 20 months in jail waiting for trial and for 10 of those months they were being transported back and forth to the court house to plead their innocence. The case fell apart because of the length of time it took the Crown to begin the case. Some of the accused were released after their time imprisoned awaiting trial. Others faced an additional 18 months, and 22 of the accused accepted plea bargains. The Manitoba Warriors' growth was not slowed by Operation Northern Snow.

Project Octopus 
In 2008, the police were again involved in an investigation into the Manitoba Warriors who were becoming a notorious street gang. The RCMP alerted the Winnipeg police that the Manitoba Warriors were exploiting government funding for a "homeless" initiative called Paa Pii Wak. The investigation was launched in December 2008 and it did not take long for it to become clear that the Manitoba Warriors were using Paa Pii Wak to further their criminal activities. The investigation showed that the Warriors exploited Paa Pii Wak in a few different ways. They used the organization to give active gang members and associates a legitimate source of income. it also gave gang members the authority to supervise gang members on court ordered release and gave the MW a way to extract active gang members from the centre. It also gave the Manitoba Warriors the ability to amend court orders rendering them ineffective. It was also known that the "staff" permitted the use of alcohol and drugs in the shelter. This was a real blow for the Homeless community because the Paa Pii Wak facilities that were supposed to help them were being used by a criminal organization.

Books

References

Organizations established in 1993
1993 establishments in Manitoba
Organizations based in Winnipeg
Gangs in Manitoba
Indigenous gangs